The North Sea Region (NSR) of Europe refers to European countries and regions that have access to the North Sea. Cultural and economic co-operation has a strong tradition in the area, dating back to the Vikings and the Hanseatic League.

Although not a formally established entity, in political terms the North Sea Region is consolidated through international organisations like the North Sea Commission and transnational co-operation programmes like the North Sea Region Programme of the European Union.

Geographic area

North Sea Commission 
The partnership of the CPMR North Sea Commission consists of most Norwegian county councils (Trondelag, More og Romsdal, Vestland, Rogaland, Agder, Vestfold og Telemark and Viken), the regions Halland, Västra Götaland and Örebro in Sweden, the three Danish regions of Nordjylland, Midtjylland and Syddanmark, the German Länder Schleswig-Holstein, Lower Saxony and Bremen, all coastal provinces of the Netherlands (Groningen, Friesland, Drenthe, Flevoland, North Holland, South Holland and Zeeland) and the Province of West Flanders in Belgium as well as counties and authorities from eastern England (Southend-on-Sea) and Scotland (Aberdeen City, Aberdeenshire, Fife and Highland).

North Sea Region Programme – Cooperation Area 
It consists of the whole of Norway and Denmark, the eastern parts of the UK, parts of the Flemish Region of Belgium, the north western regions of Germany, the northern and western parts of the Netherlands and the south western region of Sweden. Geographically, the region is connected by the large sea basin of the North Sea.

Population 
Based on the co-operation area of the North Sea Region Programme, about 60 million inhabitants (2003) live in the North Sea Region. The population density of the region varies widely, ranging from sparsely populated areas like Finnmark in Norway to densely inhabited urban centres like the German city of Hamburg.

Economy 
The North Sea Region belongs to the most prosperous parts of the European Union. The average level of GDP across the region was  €28,516 per capita in 2002 ($ in 2002 conversion rate). The unemployment rate is below the EU average in most areas. However, there are notable differences concerning economic performance and employment between the areas in the North Sea Region.

Currently, the economic structure of the regions bordering the North Sea is undergoing considerable changes, such as shrinking labour markets in the agriculture and fisheries sector and a decline in old industrialised areas.

See also 
 North Sea
 North Sea Commission (NSC)
 North Sea Region Programme (NSRP)

References

External links

 North Sea Region Programme 2007–2013
 North Sea Region Programme 2000–2006

Region
Euroregions
Transnationalism